Krachimir is a village in Vidin Province in northwestern Bulgaria. It is located in the municipality of Belogradchik.

References

Sources
 Michev Nicholas & Peter Koledarov. "Dictionary of settlements and settlement names in Bulgaria 1878-1987", Sofia, 1989.

External links
 Vidin-online
 Legends of Krachimir (in Bulgarian)

Villages in Vidin Province
Belogradchik Municipality